Declan Maxwell is a former Gaelic footballer from County Leitrim, Ireland. Playing at both midfield and forward positions, Maxwell was a panel member of the Leitrim county football team from 2002. He won the Leitrim "County Player of the Year" in 2009.

He is a former member of the Drumreilly club, with whom he won the Leitrim Intermediate Football Championship in 2007. He moved to the Tara Gaels club in London in 2011, becoming unavailable for selection for Leitrim.

References 

Year of birth missing (living people)
Living people
Drumreilly Gaelic footballers
Leitrim inter-county Gaelic footballers